The High Sheriff of Clare was a High Sheriff title. Records show that the title was in existence from at least the late 16th century, though it is not used today in the modern Republic of Ireland. The title existed within County Clare in the west of Ireland during the time of the Kingdom of Ireland and then as part of the United Kingdom of Great Britain and Ireland.

The office was a position with some significant power, the sheriffs were responsible for the maintenance of law and order and various other roles. Some of its powers were relinquished in 1831 as the Lord Lieutenant of Clare was instated to deal with military duties. It was only in 1908 under Edward VII of the United Kingdom that the Lord Lieutenant position became more senior than the High Sheriff. Its previous roles were later taken up also by the High Court judges, magistrates, coroners, local authorities and the police.

In Clare, the office of High Sheriff was established when Connacht was shired around 1569 and ceased to exist with the establishment of the Irish Free State in 1922.

Part of the Kingdom of Ireland

House of Plantagenet 
1375: Clement  Laragh

House of Tudor

1570 Teige O'Brien
1576 Donnell Reagh McNamara
1577 Teige O'Brien
1578–1580 Turlough O'Brien
1582 Sir George Cusack
1584 Cruise (full name unknown)
1588 Boetius Clancy
1599 Richard Scurlock

House of Stuart

1605 Laurence Delahoyde
1607 Sir Nicholas Moid
1609 Turlough M‘Mahon
1610 John M‘Namara
1612 John Thornton
1613 Samuel Norton
1615 Boetius Clancy
1616 Donogh O’Brien
1622 Samuel Norton
1623 Sir John M‘Namara
1624 Capt. Daniel Norton
1628 Donogh O'Brien
1634 Donogh O'Brien
1635 Turlogh O'Brien
1641 William Brigdall
1643 Daniel O'Brien
1643 Boetius Clancy
1644 George Colpoys
1645 William Brigdall
1646 Robert Starkie of Dromoland

Commonwealth of England

1654 Sir Thomas Southwell, 1st Baronet
1656 William Pigott
1657 Sir William King, Kt

House of Stuart, restoration

1661 Thomas Cullen
1662–1663 George Purdon
1664 George Ross of Fortfergus
1665 Giles Vandeleur of Ralahine
1666–1667 Thomas Greene
1669 Samuel Burton
1670 Thomas Foote
1671 Thomas Hickman
1672 Benjamin Lucas
1673 Henry Ivers
1674 Mountfort Westropp of Bunratty
1675 Walter Hickman of Doonnagurroge
1676 John Colpoys
1677 Henry Lee of Clonderalaw
1678 Thomas Hickman of Barntick
1679 Sir Samuel Foxon
1681 George Stamer of Carnelly
1682 Donogh O'Brien of Newtown
1683 Giles Vandeleur of Ralahine
1684 Simon Purdon
1685 Edmond Pery, of Enagh
1686 Henry Cooper
1687 Redmond O'Hehir, Drumcaran
1688–1689 John M'Namara, Cratloe
1690 Sir Donogh O'Brien
1691–1692 Francis Burton
1693 Edmond Pery of Enagh
1694 David Bindon
1695 Thomas Hickman, Barntick
1696 Simon Purdon
1697 Thomas Spaight of Lodge
1698 Mountifort Westropp
1699 Henry Hickman
1700 John Cusack, Kilkishen
1701 William Smith
1702 Michael Cole
1703 Henry O'Brien of Stonehall
1704 William Butler
1705 Francis Gore of Clonroad
1706 Boyle Vandeleur of Kilrush
1707 Morgan Ryan
1708 George Hickman
1709 Robert Harrison of Fortfergus
1710 John Ivers of Mount Ivers
1711 George Colpoys of Ballycar
1712 William Butler of Roscroe

House of Hanover

1713 Robert Maghlin and Henry Bridgeman
1714 Thomas Hickman jnr
1715 Arthur Gore of Clonroad
1716 George Roche
1717 William Stamer of Carnelly
1718 Thomas Bellasyse
1719 Samuel Bindon of Rockmount
1720 Henry Ivers, Teige M'Namara
1721 Arthur Ward of Cappa Lodge
1722 John Ringrose of Moynoe
1723 William Fitzgerald
1724 John Ross-Lewin, Fortfergus
1725 Thomas Spaight of Bunratty
1726 Robert Hickman of Barntick
1727 Thomas Studdert of Bunratty
1728 Charles M'Donnell, Kilkee
1729 Poole Hickman, Kilmore
1730 James Fitzgerald, Stonehall
1731 Robert Maghlin of Feakle
1732 Thomas M'Mahon, Ballykilty
1733 Edmond Brown, Ballyslattery
1734 Luke Hickman, Fenloe
1735 Nicholas Bindon, Rockmount
1736 John Brady, Raheens
1737 St. John Bridgeman, Woodfield
1738 Richard Henn, Paradise Hill
1739 Augustus Fitzgerald, Silvergrove
1740 George Purdon, Tinneranna
1741 John Stacpoole, Cloghaunatinny
1742 Robert Harrison, Garrura
1743 James Butler, Newmarket
1744 John Westropp, Lismeehan
1745 Edmond Brown, Ballyslattery
1746 Robert Westropp, Fortanne
1747 Patrick Richard England, Lifford
1748 John Colpoys, Ballycar
1749 Henry Hickman, Kilmore
1750 William Blood, Bohersallagh
1751 Pierce Creagh, Dangan
1752 Joseph England, Cahercalla
1753 Andrew Morony, Dunnaha
1754 Francis Foster, Cloneen
1755 Harrison Ross-Lewin, Fortfergus
1756 Thomas Burton, Carrigaholt
1757 George Stamer, Carnelly
1758 Edward O'Brien, Ennistymon
1759 Edmond Hogan, Doonbeg
1760 Charles M'Donnell, Kilkee
1761 Edward FitzGerald, Stonehall
1762 John Scott, Cahircon
1763 George Stacpoole, Cragbrien
1764 Crofton Vandeleur, Kilrush
1765 James Burke, Loughburk
1766 William Henn, Paradise
1767 Anthony Casey, Seafield
1768 Thomas Arthur, Glenomera
1769 Sir Hugh Dillon Massey, 1st Baronet of Doonass
1770 George Quin, Quinsborough
1771 George Colpoys, Ballycar
1772 Ralph Westropp, Attyflynn
1773 Thomas Brown, Ballyslattery
1774 William Blood, jnr, Roxton
1775 Poole Westropp, Fortan
1776 Pierce Creagh, Dangan
1777 James O'Brien, Ennis
1778 Andrew Creagh, Cahiebane.
1779 William Stamer, Carnelly
1780 Edward William Burton, Clifden
1781 Joseph Peacock, Barntick
1782 Poole Hickman, Kilmore
1783 Hon. Henry Edward O'Brien, Ballyboro
1784 William Stacpoole, Annagh
1785 Thomas Studdert, Bunratty
1786 Donogh O'Brien, Cratloe
1787 Edward O'Brien, Ennis
1788 Francis Drew, Drewsborough
1789 Francis M'Namara, Moyriesk
1790 William Daxon, Fountain
1791 William Spaight, Corbally
1792 Laurence Comyn, Birchfield
1793 Henry Brady, Raheens
1794 George Studdert, Clonderlaw
1795 Samuel Spaight, Clare Lodge
1796 Thomas Morony, Milltown Malbay
1797 Jonas Studdert, Claremont
1798 William Nugent Macnamara, Doolin
1799 George Studdert, Kilkishen
1800 William Burton, Clifden

Part of the United Kingdom of Great Britain and Ireland

House of Hanover

1801 Thomas Steele, Cullane
1802 James Molony, Kiltanan
1803 Christopher Lysaght, Woodmount
1804 Robert Westropp of Fortanne
1805 Thomas Studdert, jnr of Bunratty
1806 Bindon Scott, Cahercon
1807 John O'Callaghan, Maryfort
1808 Thomas Brown, Tyredagh
1809 Thomas Studdert, Kilkishen
1810 William Scott, Knoppoge
1811 Thady M'Namara, Ayle
1812 Thomas Mahon of Ennis
1813 James O'Brien, Woodfield
1814 Poole Gabbett, Castlekeale
1815 Richard Studdert, Clonderalaw
1816 Donat O'Brien, Cratloe
1817 Edward B. Armstrong, Ennis
1818 George William Stamer, Carnelly
1819 Bindon Blood, Rockforest
1820 John M'Donnell, Newhall
1821 William Casey, Seafield
1822 Poole Hickman, Kilmore
1823 John Vandeleur, Ralahine
1824 Rt. Hon. John Ormsby Vandeleur of Kilrush
1825 John Singleton, Quinville
1826 Andrew Finnucane of Ennistimon
1827 Richard John Stacpoole of Edenvale, Ennis
1828 James Molony, Kiltanan
1829 Simon George Purdon
1830 Augustine Fitzgerald Butler, of Ballyline
1831 George Studdert, Clonderalaw
1832 Crofton Moore Vandeleur of Kilrush House, Kilrush
1833 Sir Hugh Dillon Massey, 2nd Baronet of Summer Hill, O'Brien's Bridge
1834 Charles Mahon, Cahercalla
1835 Lucius O'Brien
1836 John O'Brien, of Elmvale
1837 John M'Mahon, Firgrove
1838 Thomas Crowe, Dromore House, Ruan
1839 Francis M'Namara, of Doolin (son of William, HS 1798)
1840 John Bindon Scott
1841 Hugh O'Loughlen of Port
1842 William FitzGerald, Adelphi
1843 William Skerrett, Finavarra
1844 William Butler, of Bunnahow
1845 Hugh Palliser Hickman, Fenloe
1846 Michael Finucane Stamerpark
1847 Robert A. Studdert, Kilkishen
1848 Henry S. Burton, Carrigaholt
1849 Sir Edward FitzGerald, 3rd Baronet, of Carrigoran, Newmarket-on-Fergus
1850 Major William Hawkins Ball of Fortfergus
1851 James Butler, Castlecrine.
1852 Edmond John Armstrong, Willowbank.
1853 William Edward Armstrong M'Donnell, Newhall, Ennis.
1854 Edward Percival Westby of Roebuck Castle, Dundrum.
1855 Charles George O'Callaghan of Ballynahinch, Tulla.
1856 Francis Gore of Tyredagh.
1857 Francis Macnamara Calcutt.
1858 James O'Brien of Ballinalacken.
1859 Andrew Stacpoole
1860 Wainright Crowe of Cahercalla.
1861 Burdett Moroney of Miltown.
1862 Hon. Edward O'Brien.
1863 William Thomas Butler, jnr, of Bunnahow.
1864 Richard Stacpoole, jnr, of Edenvale, Ennis.
1865 William Mills Molony, Kiltanan.
1866 John Wilson Lynch, Belvoir.
1867 Edmund Maghlin Blood, of Brickhill.
1868 James Thomas Foster Vesey FitzGerald, of Moyriesk.
1869 Robert William Carey Reeves, Burrane, Knock.
1870 Francis Nathaniel Valentine Burton, of Carrigaholt Castle.
1871 Sir Augustine FitzGerald.
1872 Hector Stewart Vandeleur, of Kilrush.
1873 Cornelius Alexander Keogh, of Birchfield, Liscannor
1874 Richard Studdert, Bunratty.
1875 Horace Stafford O'Brien, Cratloe Woods.
1876 Stephen Roland Woulfe, Teermaclane, Ennis.
1877 Thomas Crowe, Dromore.
1878 Nicholas Smith O'Gorman, Belleview, Kilrush.
1879 James Frost, Ballymorris.
1880 George Thomas Stacpoole Mahon, Corbally.
1881 Theobald Butler, of Ballyline.
1882 William Wilson FitzGerald, Adelphi.
1883 Bagot Blood, of Templemaley
1884 Francis William Hickman, of Kilmore.
1885 Henry Valentine M'Namara of Ennistimon (son of Francis, HS 1839).
1886 William Conyngham Vandeleur Burton (Conyngham), of Carrigaholt Castle.
1887 Col. Charles Synge of Mountcallan.
1888 Henry Vassal D'Esterre of Rossmanaher.
1889 John Vandeleur Phelps of Waterpark.
1890 Col. Arthur Hare Vincent of Summerhill.
1891 Robert G. Parker of Ballyvally.
1892 William James Macnamara of Ennistymon. (brother of Henry Valentine, HS 1885)
1893 John O'Connell Bianconi.
1894 Richard John Stacpoole of Edenvale, Ennis.
1896 Erasmus Vandeleur Westby of Kilballyowen.
1897 William Walter Augustine FitzGerald.
1898 Lucius William O'Brien of Dromoland, Newmarket-on-Fergus.
1899 Lt-Col. Frederick St Leger Tottenham of Mount Callan.
1900 Sir Michael O'Loghlen, 4th Baronet.

House of Windsor

References

 Notes on the Sheriffs of County Clare

High Sheriffs of Clare
Clare
History of County Clare